The Troika was an unofficial name for the alliance between the three parties (Ennahda, Ettakatol, and CPR) that ruled in Tunisia after the 2011 Constituent Assembly election. Ali Laarayedh stepped down as prime minister on 9 January 2014; Mehdi Jomaa was appointed in his place on 10 January 2014.

References 

Political party alliances in Tunisia